Full Blast is a 1999 film by Canadian director Rodrigue Jean, his first long feature. Filmed in Bathurst, New Brunswick, the film was written by Nathalie Loubeyre as an adaptation of Martin Pitre's novel L'Ennemi que je connais. It was the first French-language feature film funded by Film New Brunswick, the provincial film development agency.

The film had its theatrical premiere at the 1999 Toronto International Film Festival, before going into general theatrical release in early 2000.

Plot
A strike at a sawmill in a small fictional community in New Brunswick puts Steph (David La Haye) and Piston (Martin Desgagné) out of work. They want to resurrect their band Lost Tribe, but Marie-Lou (Marie-Jo Thério), Piston's ex-wife and the band's former lead singer, is not enthusiastic about the idea.

Meanwhile, the bisexual Steph is having relationship trouble with Rose (Louise Portal), an older woman that he's been seeing and drifts first to Marie-Lou and then to Charles (Patrice Godin), who once left town but is now back.

Cast
 David La Haye as Steph
 Martin Desgagné as Piston
 Louise Portal as Rose
 Marie-Jo Thério as Marie-Lou
 Patrice Godin as Charles
 Daniel Desjardins as Chico
 Luc Proulx as Steph's Father
 Danica Arsenault as Juliette
 Channon Roe 'Razor'

Awards
At the Toronto International Film Festival, the film received an honorable mention from the Best Canadian First Feature Film jury.

The film received four Prix Jutra nominations at the 3rd Jutra Awards in 2001, for Best Actor (La Haye), Best Actress (Portal), Best Supporting Actress (Thério) and Best Original Music (Robert Marcel Lepage). Thério won the award for Best Supporting Actress.

References

External links

1999 films
Canadian drama films
Films directed by Rodrigue Jean
Films set in New Brunswick
Films shot in New Brunswick
Canadian LGBT-related films
LGBT-related drama films
1999 drama films
Films based on Canadian novels
Male bisexuality in film
1999 LGBT-related films
1990s French-language films
French-language Canadian films
1990s Canadian films